Senator Crothers may refer to:

Austin Lane Crothers (1860–1912), Maryland State Senate
Brenham C. Crothers (1905–1984), Louisiana State Senate